was a Japanese voice actress from Tokyo, Japan.

Filmography

Anime
Makiko Shikishima in Tetsujin 28-go (1980)
Midori Kurenai in Hell Girl
Hazuki's Grandmother in Ojamajo Doremi
Sawako Sawanoguchi in Magic User's Club (TV)
Grandis Granva in Nadia: The Secret of Blue Water
"Medusa no kimi" Katsuragi in Oniisama e...
Amia in The Ultraman
Akemi Tamano in Wedding Peach
Dunfin in The Wonderful Adventures of Nils
Kurama's Mother in Yu Yu Hakusho
Ayame Sujita in Mirai Robo Daltanious

Dubbing
 Gizmo in Gremlins (Japanese dub)
 Newt in Aliens (1988 Japanese dub)
 Annabelle in All Dogs Go to Heaven (Japanese dub)
 Missy in Bill & Ted's Bogus Journey (Japanese dub)
 Nora Carpenter in Final Destination 2 (Japanese dub)
 Frigga in Thor (Japanese dub)
 Frigga in Avengers: Endgame (Japanese dub)
 Tania in Enter the Dragon (Japanese dub)
 Ellis Grey in Grey's Anatomy (Japanese dub)

References

External links
 Kumiko Takizawa at Ryu's Seiyuu Infos
 

1952 births
2022 deaths
Voice actresses from Tokyo
Japanese video game actresses
Japanese voice actresses
81 Produce voice actors